The 1934 Palestine Cup (HaGavia HaEretz-Israeli) was the sixth season of Israeli Football Association's nationwide football cup competition. The defending holders were Maccabi Tel Aviv.

For the second year in a row, Maccabi Tel Aviv and Hapoel Tel Aviv met in the final. This time the winners were Hapoel Tel Aviv, winning their second final.

Results

Quarter-finals

Bye: Maccabi Nes Tziona

Semi-finals

Final

References

External links
 Israel Football Association website 

Israel State Cup
Cup
Israel State Cup seasons